The 1990–91 season of the Moroccan Throne Cup was the 35th edition of the competition.

Kawkab Marrakech won the cup, beating KAC Kénitra 2–1 in the final, played at the Prince Moulay Abdellah Stadium in Rabat. Kawkab Marrakech won the competition for the fifth time in their history.

Competition

Last 16

Quarter-finals

Semi-finals

Final 
The final took place between the two winning semi-finalists, Kawkab Marrakech and KAC Kénitra, at the Prince Moulay Abdellah Stadium in Rabat.

Notes and references 

1990
1990 in association football
1991 in association football
1990–91 in Moroccan football